Reynolds Secondary School is a public secondary school in the Greater Victoria suburb of Saanich, British Columbia, Canada. The school is known for its numerous specialized programs, including flexible studies, French immersion, robotics club, band, and its Centre for Soccer Excellence program. Reynolds also offers many career planning programs such as CP Theatre, CP Art, CP Recreation, CP Tourism, CP Journalism and co-op.

Reynolds is an active supporter of the Cops for Cancer fundraiser for the Canadian Cancer Society.  The school holds various fundraisers such as car washes, head shaves, and bake sales to raise money for the cause. In 2010, students and staff raised over $52,000, $80,000 in 2011, and over $100,000 in 2012, and in 2022, they had reached the $1,000,000 mark in total money raised.

Programs 

 French immersion
 Centre for Soccer Excellence
 Flexible studies
 Robotics team competing in the FIRST Robotics Competition
 Band
 Musical theatre
 Outdoors club

Robotics Team 
The Reynolds ReyBots (team number 7787) competed for the first time ever in the 2019 FIRST Robotics Competition season. They are recipients of the Rookie All-Star Award, awarded for excellent team management, business plan, and exemplifying the mission of FIRST. The award included an invite to the FIRST Championship in Houston, Texas, which they attended in March 2019.

After such a successful first year, the team is expanding by founding a FIRST Tech Challenge team to build their students' skills even more.

Musical Theatre 
The musical theatre has a new performance prepared every year.

 The Wedding Singer (2023)
 Sister Act (2019)
 Spamalot (2018)
 Guys and Dolls (2017)
 Grease (2016)
 Seussical (2015)
 Curtains (2014)
 How to Succeed in Business Without Really Trying (2013)
 Bye Bye Birdie (2012)
 The Music Man (2011)

Notable alumni

John Horgan, politician and former premier of British Columbia

References

High schools in British Columbia
Saanich, British Columbia
Educational institutions in Canada with year of establishment missing